Nabiha Ben Miled (4 March 1919-6 May 2009) was a pioneering, Tunisian women's rights activist and independentist, who was a leader in the press for women's rights and Tunisian independence from French colonialism. She served as president of the Union of Tunisian Women from 1952 to 1963 and wrote articles in favor of Tunisia's independence.

Early life
Nabiha Ben Abdallah was born on 4 March 1919 in Tunis, which at the time was located in the French protectorate of Tunisia to Baya Bint Mahjoub and Othman Bin Abdallah. Her parents were part of the Tunisian bourgeoisie, whose ancestors had settled in Tunis in the nineteenth century. She attended Sidi Saber Primary School and had aspirations to become a teacher, or a lawyer, but her father discouraged her from further studies after she graduated from primary school. At the age of fifteen, she married the doctor , who had been educated in France and was a leader in the Tunisian Communist Movement. Though her mother had insisted that she wear her hijab as a child, her husband was modern and encouraged Miled to live without being veiled.

Activism
Initially formed to support the education of girls, by 1938, they had extended their aims to provide assistance to political prisoners and those involved in the independence movement, seeking an end to the French colonial government. When demonstrators were injured during a protest on 9 April 1938, Dr. Miled turned their home into a hospital and Nabiha assisted him, providing nursing services for those injured by the colonial forces. During World War II, she gave birth to the couple's only daughter, Khadija, during a severe famine. She and her husband provided boxed milk to neighbors in their Halfaouine neighborhood and she organized a soup kitchen. Using contacts with local merchants, Miled led the neighborhood women to make two hundred meals each day from products donated by local merchants.

In 1944, Miled left the MWUT, disillusioned by the lack of action of the group and its reliance on the political party Destour. She joined the Tunisian Women's Union (TWU), which was affiliated with the Tunisian Communist Party. Her ideological crisis had come about because the leadership of Destour, rather than demanding Tunisian autonomy, was in favor liberalization through a modification of the current constitution. Miled was in favor of the more radical approach, which combined nationalist goals with social improvement programs aimed at providing women's rights and schooling opportunities for disadvantaged children. In 1951, she was appointed to serve on the board of the TWU and the following year became president of the organization, serving in that capacity until it was dissolved in 1963 for its close ties to the communist party. From 1952, she also helped her husband, Mohamed El Salami, and Mohamed Saleh Ka'far write and clandestinely deliver the newspaper Commandos, which urged Tunisians to become involved in liberating themselves and fight for their right to nationhood.

Rather than join the National Union of Tunisian Women, which Miled saw as too closely allied with the one-party state, she left the formal women's movements, though she continued to publish articles in a French magazine, The Proletarian Revolution until her death. With her children grown, she began working as a social worker at the Charles Nicolle Hospital in Tunis, but resigned when the staff began to pressure her to inform on colleagues and adhere to religious practices. In 1993 a history of the women involved in the nationalist movement in Tunisia, Mémoire de femmes: Tunisiennes dans la vie publique, 1920–1960 (Memoirs of women: Tunisians in public life, 1920–1960) contained a biographical sketch of Miled.

Death and legacy
Miled died in Tunis on 6 May 2009. In 2013, the Ilhem Marzouki Feminist University held a tribute in her memory to honor the contributions of historic women to feminism in Tunisia.

References

Citations

Bibliography

1919 births
2009 deaths
People from Tunis
Tunisian feminists
Tunisian independence activists
20th-century women writers